General elections were held in Malaysia on Saturday, 25 April 1964 to elect members of the second parliament. Voting took place in 104 out of 159 parliamentary constituencies of Malaysia, each electing one Member of Parliament to the Dewan Rakyat, the dominant house of Parliament. State elections also took place in 282 state constituencies in 11 (out of 14, except Sabah, Sarawak and Singapore) states of Malaysia on the same day, each electing one Member of the Legislative Assembly to the Dewan Undangan Negeri.

The result was a victory for the Alliance Party, which won 89 of the 104 seats. Voter turnout was 78.9%. The result also contributed towards the eventual expulsion of Singapore from Malaysia. The Singaporean-based People's Action Party decided to run on the mainland, and although it attracted large crowds at its rallies, it won only one seat – that by Devan Nair, who represented the Bangsar constituency (now part of Seputeh and Lembah Pantai constituencies).  It is thought by some historians that Finance Minister and MCA President Tan Siew Sin's appeal to the Chinese to avoid challenging the Malay special rights and risk merger with Indonesia helped the MCA retain its status as the "undisputed leader of the Chinese in the Malayan peninsula". Nevertheless, UMNO leaders were furious with the PAP.

It was the first parliamentary general election held after the formation of Malaysia in 1963.  State elections were not held in Singapore, Sabah and Sarawak. Transitional provisions allowed the state legislatures of the three states to choose their parliamentary representatives until the next election. The three states had been allocated a total of 55 seats in the Malaysian Parliament: 15 seats for Singapore, 16 seats for Sabah and 24 seats for Sarawak. Together, the three states held 34% out the 159 seats in the parliament. This was intended to act as a check to prevent parliament from passing constitutional amendments (which require a two-thirds majority) without the agreement of representatives from the three new states. After Singapore left Malaysia, Sabah and Sarawak were only left with 25% of the seats, as a consequence Sabah and Sarawak were not able to stop the parliament from approving laws that would encroach on the special rights granted to Sabah and Sarawak upon merger to form Malaysia.

Two Alliance candidates were returned unopposed.

Results

By state

Johore

Kedah

Kelantan

Malacca

Negri Sembilan

Pahang

Penang

Perak

Perlis

Selangor

Terrengganu

See also
1964 Malaysian state elections

References

General elections in Malaysia
Malaysia
General
Singapore in Malaysia